She Made Them Do It is a Canadian telefilm based on the true story of American murderer Sarah Jo Pender. It was directed by Grant Harvey and stars Jenna Dewan-Tatum, Mackenzie Phillips and Steve Bacic. It premiered on the Lifetime Network in December 2012.

Plot 
In Indiana, Sarah Jo Pender, a student, is sent to prison after her two roommates were murdered by her boyfriend Rick. She claims her innocence. After one of her appeals is denied, she escapes with the help of Prison Guard Scott Spitler and her friend Jamie Long. The Marshall Sean Harlan unsuccessfully pursues her and has to rely on the help of TV show America's Most Wanted. After Pender is captured by local police officers, he picks her up and drives her back to prison.

Cast 
 Jenna Dewan-Tatum: Sarah Jo Pender
 MacKenzie Phillips: Jamie Long
 Steve Bacic: Marshall Sean Harlan
 Nels Lennarson: Scott Spitler Sr
 Greyston Holt: Rick
 John Walsh: himself

External links 
 She Made Them Do it Movie official page on the Lifetime website

References

2012 television films
2012 films
2010s crime drama films
Canadian crime drama films
Canadian drama television films
Crime films based on actual events
English-language Canadian films
Films about murderers
Films set in Indiana
Films set in the 2000s
Lifetime (TV network) films
2010s Canadian films